Album recorded by female Japanese pop artist Watanabe Misato. It was released on October 8, 2008 by Sony Music Entertainment.

Track listings

Lovin' you
My Revolution
10 years
Thank you
Sugao (=Natural face)
BELIEVE
Kokoro Ginga (=Heart Galaxy)
PAJAMA TIME
Kanashii Boyfriend (=Sad Boyfriend)
Kanashii ne (=Sad, isn't it?)
My Love Your Love - Tatta Hitori sika inai Anata he (=To the one and only you) -
Kiss from a rose

External links
Sony Music Entertainment - Official site for Watanabe Misato. 
Album Page - Direct link to page with song listing and music samples.

2008 albums
Misato Watanabe albums